The Flight Design Stream is a German single-place, paraglider that was designed by Michaël Hartmann and Stefan Müller and produced by Flight Design of Landsberied. It is now out of production.

Design and development
The Stream was designed as an intermediate glider. Test flying was carried out by factory test pilot Richard Bergmann. The models are each named for their approximate wing area in square metres/relative size.

Variants
Stream S
Small-sized model for lighter pilots. Its  span wing has 52 cells and the aspect ratio is 5.3:1. The glider model is DHV 1-2 certified.
Stream M
Mid-sized model for medium-weight pilots. The glider model is DHV 1-2 certified.
Stream L
Large-sized model for heavier pilots. The glider model is DHV 1-2 certified.

Specifications (Stream L)

References

Stream
Paragliders